The 20825/20826 Bilaspur - Nagpur Vande Bharat Express is India's 6th Vande Bharat Express train, connecting the states of Chhattisgarh and Maharashtra.

Overview 
This train is operated by Indian Railways, connecting Bilaspur Jn, Raipur Jn, Durg Jn, Raj Nandgaon, Gondia Jn and Nagpur Jn. It is currently operated with train numbers 20825/20826 on 6 days a week basis.

Rakes 
It is the fourth 2nd Generation train of Vande Bharat Expresses and was designed and manufactured by the Integral Coach Factory (ICF) under the leadership of Sudhanshu Mani at Perambur, Chennai under the Make in India initiative.

Coach Composition 
The 20825/20826 Bilaspur - Nagpur Vande Bharat Express currently has 14 AC Chair Car and 2 Executive Chair Cars coaches.

The coaches in Aqua color indicate AC Chair Cars and the coaches in Pink color indicate AC Executive Chair Cars.

Service 
The Maximum Permissible Speed (MPS) given is 130 km/hr.

Schedule 
The schedule of this 20825/20826 Bilaspur - Nagpur Vande Bharat Express is given below:-

Incidents 
After the launch of the 6th Vande Bharat Express (Bilaspur - Nagpur - Bilaspur), on Wednesday 14 December '22 , an unidentified man threw a stone on the windowpane of the newly inaugurated express train. This incident took place between Durg Junction and Bhilai Nagar railway station. Luckily no casualties were reported.

See also 

 Vande Bharat Express
 Tejas Express
 Gatimaan Express
 Bilaspur Junction railway station
 Nagpur Junction railway station

References 

Vande Bharat Express trains
Named passenger trains of India
Higher-speed rail
Express trains in India
 
Transport in Bilaspur, Chhattisgarh
Rail transport in Chhattisgarh
Transport in Nagpur